JIO or Jio may refer to:

 Joint Intelligence Organisation (Australia)
 Joint Intelligence Organisation (United Kingdom)
 Jio, a 4G data services company in India, owned by Reliance Industries
 jio, ISO 639 code for the Jiamao language

See also
 J10 (disambiguation)